Superfights is a 1995 martial arts film directed and choreographed by Tony Leung Siu-Hung. The film stars newcomer Brandon Gaines, Chinese actress Yu Feihong, and martial artists Keith Vitali, Chuck Jeffreys, Cliff Lenderman, and Brian Ruth amongst others. The film was the first American production by Hong Kong-based Seasonal Film Corporation since their 1991 film American Shaolin.

Plot

Jack Cody has always been a fan of the Superfights, a televised event that meshes the likes of martial arts and professional wrestling. During an event, Jack meets one of his idols, No Mercy Budokai, who while cheering is nearly given a cheap chair shot by the heel known as The Enforcer. Jack blocks the chair shot and Budokai thanks him before competing in the ring. Budokai wins the fight against the Enforcer to the crowd's delight.

Jack is such a rabid fan that he spends his days during work practicing his martial arts in a local warehouse. While ridiculed by his supervisor, Jack still gets his job done. One night, en route home, he sees a young woman, Sally Wong, about to be robbed at an ATM. Jack is able to fend off the robbers and Sally invites him to her house to meet her grandfather. The grandfather is not grateful for Jack's heroism and even goes as far as thinking he set the robbery up to impress Sally. The grandfather is revealed to be quite a martial artist himself and tests Jack out only to humiliate him. Jack leaves and Sally is embarrassed by what had transpired. When Jack returns home, he finds news crews all over his house as surveillance video reveals his heroic actions. The newscast grabs the attention of Robert Sawyer, the owner of the Superfights, who wants to make Jack an offer.

Despite his mother's reservations, Jack accepts the offer to join the Superfights. He is nicknamed "The All-American Hero" and befriends the likes of fellow Superfighters Budokai, Night Stalker, and Dark Cloud. However, before he can become a full Superfighter, Jack must undergo training with Angel, one of the top Superfighters. During training, Angel flirts with Jack and has him take some pills, which Angel says are vitamins. Jack eventually proves himself ready for his first fight, in which he faces the Enforcer. During their match, the Enforcer puts Jack in a headlock and Sally, who is in the audience, begins a "Jack Cody" chant, which motivates Jack to fight and eventually win his debut match. Soon, Jack begins to win more and more matches, but after a match with The Mercenary, he begins to suspect that maybe the veterans are going soft on him because he's a rookie. However, Angel confides in Jack that he is winning.

During a jog one morning, Jack sees a mysterious man dressed like a ninja. The man warns him that he is not winning the matches as he thinks he is and that the Superfights are not just about the sport. The ninja does an armbar and wristlock to Jack and tells him that the Superfights are also about some criminal activities. He also warns Jack not to take the pills as they are not vitamins. It is revealed that the Superfighters are involved in taking over criminal activity all over city. This is seen when Budokai, Night Stalker, and Dark Cloud beat up a local gang who refuses to give half of their money to them.

Meanwhile, Jack runs into Sally's grandfather at the park and in his own way, the grandfather apologizes to Jack for his actions. He even tells Jack he is teaching Sally martial arts and to meet him at a local gym the next day. It is there where Jack and Sally begin to train in the art of Tai Chi. Grandfather teaches Jack this style to complement his hard style martial arts. As Jack continues to train with Grandfather, he begins to win his matches using his combined style. When Grandfather finds the "vitamins", he asks to hold on to them to have them analyzed. It is revealed that the "vitamins" are actually a combination of steroids and mind control drugs.

Robert Sawyer is revealed to be the big crime boss when he gets himself in on a drug deal that eventually goes sour. When it is revealed that "baby powder" replaced actual cocaine, he sends in his greatest fighter "The Beast" to kill the dealer. When Sawyer is confronted by the dealer's brother in his office the next morning, Sawyer reveals himself as a master martial artist who uses two rings with hooks on the end and a kick to the throat to kill his adversaries. When Jack learns he must throw a match when he faces Dark Cloud as part of the deal with Superfights, Jack refuses to give up and wins the fight. However, after being reamed out by Sawyer for disobeying him, he offers Jack a second chance. This is where Jack learns that the Superfights are more than the sport as he is forced to join Budokai, Night Stalker, and Dark Cloud to get protection from a local Chinese restaurant that he's eaten at. Returning home from the job, the ninja from earlier returns and fights Jack. However, Jack gets the upper hand and unmasks the ninja. The ninja is Budokai, who has been cooperating with the police incognito to take down Sawyer. Budokai also reveals that the Beast is Mike Rocco, Jack's childhood hero who had been forced into becoming Sawyer's top enforcer.

When Jack gets a call from Sawyer to go to a local nightclub, Jack heads there and is confronted by Angel, who by this time, does not approve of Sawyer's extracurricular activities. At the nightclub, it is revealed Sawyer has set up a fight to the death between the Beast and Budokai, whose cover had been blown. The Beast nearly kills Budokai when Jack intervenes and is able to show the Beast the pendant that was given to him as a child when the Beast was Mike Rocco. The Beast is shocked but remembers. When Sawyer orders the Beast to kill Jack, the Beast goes after Sawyer instead, only for Sawyer to retaliate and kill the Beast with a stomp to the neck. That night, Budokai is nearly dead when Grandfather comes up with the idea for he and Jack to focus their "chi" on Budokai to heal him. Successfully, they help Budokai when Jack gets a call from Sawyer. Sawyer has kidnapped Sally and Jack's mother and challenges Jack to a final fight.

Jack goes to the training grounds of the Superfights, where he takes on Sawyer in a cage match. However, Jack is able to escape and finds himself facing off against Dark Cloud and Night Stalker as well. When Sawyer attempts to get the upper hand, Sawyer and Jack are thrown through boxes. As Dark Cloud and Night Stalker look to see what happened, Jack gets up and is able to take out both Night Stalker and Dark Cloud. When Angel, who is also there, confronts Jack, she wises up and helps him free Sally and his mother. As the trio are about to leave, Sawyer returns and does a triple jump kick, knocking Sally and Mrs. Cody out. As Sawyer goes for his throat kick to Jack, Angel deflects and fights Sawyer, only to get the death kick herself. Jack finally arises and goes one-on-one with Sawyer. Sawyer proves to be too much for Jack with his intense kicking skills and hook rings. However, when Sally turns off the lights and yells for Jack to concentrate, Jack realizes he must use Tai Chi. As Sawyer goes back on the attack, Jack begins to use Tai Chi and deflects and eventually knocks down Sawyer. Jack soon gets the upper hands and ends it with a drop kick to Sawyer, sending him to the cage, where he is impaled on a wooden block with barbed wire. Angel gives her last words to Jack as she dies. The police arrive as does Grandfather and a somewhat recuperated Budokai. Grandfather tells Jack that he is truly a hero.

Cast
 Brandon Gaines as Jack Cody "The All-American Hero"
 Yu Feihong as Sally
 Keith Vitali as Robert Sawyer
 Chuck Jeffreys as Dark Cloud
 Cliff Lenderman as No Mercy Budokai
 Brian Ruth as Night Stalker
 Patrick Lung as Grandfather
 Kelly Gallant as Angel
 Karen Bill as Mrs. Cody
 Keith Hackney as The Enforcer
 Jim Steele as Mike Rocco "The Beast"
 Rob Van Dam as The Mercenary
 Keith W. Strandberg as Passerby

Production
The film was shot on location in Harrisburg, Pennsylvania in early 1995. The film was inspired by the 1990s steroid scandal that rocked World Wrestling Entertainment. The character of Robert Sawyer was based on WWE Chairman Vince McMahon, who was accused in the 1990s of giving his wrestlers steroids. However, McMahon was eventually acquitted of the charges.

Release
American Home Entertainment released the film on home video until July 24, 1997. Pathfinder Home Entertainment released the film on Region 1 DVD on July 1, 2003. In Germany, the film is titled Karate Tiger 9.

External links
 
 

Hong Kong martial arts films
1995 martial arts films
Martial arts tournament films
1990s English-language films
American martial arts films
1990s American films